Novagen Software Ltd (commonly referred to as Novagen) was a British software developer which released a number of computer games on a variety of platforms from the mid-1980s to the early 1990s.

The company was set up by Paul Woakes and Bruce Jordan and employed approximately 18 people. In addition to running Novagen, Paul Woakes also developed and programmed the vast majority of the company's products  and the first version of a custom loading scheme that worked ten times faster than Commodore's own, which became Novaload.

Games
  Encounter (1983) Atari 8-bit, (1984) C64
  Mercenary (1985) Atari 8-bit, C64, C16, Plus/4, ZX Spectrum, Amstrad CPC, Amiga, Atari ST
 Mercenary: The Second City (1986) expansion pack for Mercenary
 Mercenary Compendium Edition (1987) Mercenary + The Second City
  Backlash (1988) Amiga, Atari ST
  Battle Island (1988) C64
  Hell Bent (1989) Amiga, Atari ST
  Damocles: Mercenary II (1990) Amiga, Atari ST
 Damocles: Mission Disk 1 (1991) Amiga, Atari ST
 Damocles: Mission Disk 2 (1991) Amiga, Atari ST
 Damocles Compendium Edition (1991) Damocles + Mission Disk 1 + Mission Disk 2
  Encounter (1991) Amiga, Atari ST
  Mercenary III (1992) Amiga, Atari ST

References

External links
 The Novagen Team

Defunct video game companies of the United Kingdom
Software companies of the United Kingdom